Lazarevskoye is a microdistrict of Lazarevsky City District of the city of Sochi, Krasnodar Krai, Russia.  It was a resort settlement before 1961, when it was merged into Sochi.

Geography
The microdistrict is located on the shore of the Black Sea at the mouth of the Psezuapse River.

History
It was founded in 1869 as the village of Lazarevka in place of the former Lazarevskoye Fortress, which existed in 1839–1854.  The fortress was named after Admiral Mikhail Lazarev.  Later the name of the village was changed to Lazarevskoye.

On July 12, 1949, it was granted resort settlement status.  On February 11, 1961, it was merged into the city of Sochi and ceased to exist as an independent entity.

Other
Lazarevskaya railway station on the Tuapse-Adler line is located on the territory of the microdistrict.

Lazarevskoye is a popular place for beach tourism. There are two waterparks and a dolphinarium.

References

Notes

Sources

Lazarevsky City District
Seaside resorts in Russia
Populated places established in 1869
1961 disestablishments in the Soviet Union
1869 establishments in the Russian Empire